Elephant Surf is a surf company based in San Diego, California, and is the leading innovator of compression shorts for surfing. The company was founded in 2010, and specializes in lower body rash guards and compression shorts to wear under boardshorts.

Products
Elephant Surf is one of the major sponsors to top-10 ASP surfer Josh Kerr, with whom the company worked to design their flagship product; the Trunks: Josh Kerr Pro Model. The Trunks were designed to improve comfort in the water and prevent boardshort rash through the strategic placement of neoprene panels on the inner and rear thigh.

Elephant Surf also manufactures a short-run clothing line, consisting mainly of branded t-shirts and sweatshirts.

Critical Reception and Press
Upon their release, the Trunks earned critical praise from several publications, and were termed "The Cure for Boardshort Rash" by Daily Stoke, and "Surf Specific Compression Shorts...Verdict: Recommended" by Tracks Magazine. The Trunks also received praise from Thrillist, AWSM.com, Surfboard Shack, and TRND Collective. In December 2011, the Trunks were named to the 2012 Surfer Magazine Holiday Gift Guide, both online and in print.

Elephant Surf appears to have received no major critical praise for their clothing line.

Josh Kerr Sponsorship
Elephant Surf signed professional surfer Josh Kerr to a sponsorship in 2011, making them Kerr's exclusive provider of under boardshort wear.

References

External links

How To Wax a Surfboard

Sportswear brands
Surfwear brands
Swimwear manufacturers
Companies based in San Diego